Pombia Safari Park is a safari park, zoo and amusement park in Pombia, Piedmont, northern Italy, created by Angelo Lombardi in 1976; extending over an area of 400,000 square metres.
After the gradual decline of the old structure, acquired by Orfeo Triberti, owner since 1999, the park has undergone a remarkable recovery and expansion in the years ahead, it is presented as a reality more functional, consisting of two distinct areas: the entertainment area and the Safari Park.
The Safari Park also has signed a collaboration in agreement with the Faculty of Veterinary Medicine of University of Turin on research projects that relate to the pathology and the welfare of farm animals and the conservation of species at risk of extinction.

Birth of the white lion

In September 2004, after 3 months of gestation, a pair of white lions, called Flash and Moon, imported to the Safari Park by a German park, gave birth to their first litter. During the birth process, however, there were some complications that required pharmacological intervention and starting from the second day, to the mother, were subtracted the cubs, due to a shortage of milk, and, despite the use of incubators and lactating artificial, the cubs contracted a virus that took their lives in less than a month.

Two years later, in 2006, by the same couple, a white lioness called Ashanti was born and survived to adulthood, for the first time in Italy. The cub, however, as claimed by biologist of the park, Cathrin Schröder, was immediately removed from parental care, the mother didn't care about her, so the animal was artificially fed with a milk powder with high protein content.

SOS Elephants
SOS Elephants is a non-profit foundation, established in July 2011 by the Pombia Safari Park, to promote the conservation of Borneo elephant.
Its mission is to ensure the long-term survival of the pygmy elephants of the State of Sabah, Borneo (Malaysia).
In 2014, the park promoted the initiative to give more support to the foundation in support of the Borneo elephant. Due to the success of SOS Elephants, which is devoted a share of each ticket, the holder Orfeo Triberti, would indeed create, in Borneo, an area similar to a reserve, in which they can live and increase by number, because the pygmy elephants is present exclusively on the island.
The missions of the foundation SOS Elephants are to provide technical support, financial and administrative management programs, and the protection of species of elephants present in their respective protected areas, assisting in the management of protected areas or strongholds for elephants in their natural habitats, support the initiatives captive breeding and research programs conducted in the countries of origin of this species of elephant, as well as help to participate in the formulation of a comprehensive plan for captive breeding of the species of elephants.

Mammals

Acinonyx jubatus
Panthera tigris
Panthera leo
Hyaenidae
Lemur catta
Ceratotherium simum simum
Pony
Equus quagga boehmi
Hippopotamus amphibius
Lama glama
Camelus dromedarius
Giraffa camelopardalis rothschildi
Watusi cattle
Cameroon sheep
Capra hircus
Taurotragus oryx
Oryx dammah
Hystrix cristata
Equus quagga chapmani
Tragelaphus angasii
Lama guanicoe
Kobus ellipsiprymnus defassa
Oryx gazella
Horse
Cow
Ovis musimon
Ammotragus lervia
Pelecanus onocrotalus
Roan antelope
Papio hamadryas
Addax nasomaculatus
Bison bison
Donkey
Pig
White donkey
Mephitis mephitis

Gallery

References

External links

Official website
 SOS Elephants

Safari parks
Animal theme parks
Zoos in Italy
Tourist attractions in Piedmont
Parks in Piedmont
Buildings and structures in Piedmont
Zoos established in 1976
1976 establishments in Italy